The Hebridean Celtic Festival (Scottish Gaelic: Fèis Cheilteach Innse Gall) or HebCelt is an international Scottish music festival, which takes place annually in Stornoway on Lewis, in the Outer Hebrides of Scotland. Headliners to date include Runrig, Van Morrison, Deacon Blue, The Fratellis, The Levellers and KT Tunstall. Many other acts take part in the event, including visiting international artists, solo artists and local musicians. The festival regularly attracts over 16,000 attendees and provides significant economic and cultural benefits for its host area.

The main arena is situated on the Castle Green, in front of Lews Castle. Other events take place in the An Lanntair arts centre and elsewhere in Stornoway. There are also concerts in the villages of Borve and Breasclete in Lewis, and Northton in Harris.

History
The event was first held in 1996 and attracted a crowd of around 1,000 people who were mainly drawn from the local area. Over and above the music, the Festival also offers workshops, street arts, Gaelic storytelling, language tasters, and opportunities to explore the rich culture and heritage of the Outer Hebrides. 

Now firmly established as one of Scotland's great summer music festivals and the area's flagship event, the population of Stornoway swells by half during July to accommodate the annual pilgrimage of festivalgoers.

In 2007 an inter-island shinty match was added to the programme, with Lewis Camanachd and Uist Camanachd competing for the Hebcelt Trophy.

One of the most enduring outdoor Scottish festivals, in 2009 the event was voted 'Event of the Year' at the Scot Trad Music Awards, the annual awards ceremony organised by Hands up for Trad, celebrating Scottish traditional music.  The festival scooped the 'Best Large Event' at the Scottish Event Awards in October 2011 and was voted one of the top 10 music global festival by Songlines in both 2011 and 2012.

The Hebridean Celtic Festival, now in its 25th year, continues to attract a range of visitors. Over the years around ten percent of the visitors have come from around the world, around forty percent from other parts of the UK. Visitors have come from as far away as North America, Australia and New Zealand. The festival continues to overcome a variety of challenges thrown up by its distance from key markets and the changed economic climate.

The event is managed and almost wholly hosted by a loyal dedicated volunteer force.

Past bands performing at the Hebridean Celtic Festival
The event has featured main acts including Van Morrison, The Fratellis, Deacon Blue, Imelda May, The Shires, Capercaillie, Dougie MacLean, The Red Hot Chilli Pipers,   Battlefield Band, Lau, Karine Polwart, The Hot Seats, The Travelling Band, KT Tunstall, Peat & Diesel, Tide Lines, Arthur Cormack & Blair Douglas, Kathleen Macinnes Band, Iain Morrison, The Boy Who Trapped The Sun, Rusty Shackle, Fatherson, Face the West, Rose Parade, The Dirty Beggars et al. The following list includes artists that have featured at the festival

 The Proclaimers
 Van Morrison
 Runrig
 The Saw Doctors
 Big Country
 Imelda May
 Capercaillie 
 Fiddlers' Bid
 Finlay MacDonald Band
 Salsa Celtica
 Davy Spillane
 Natalie MacMaster
 Dougie MacLean
 The Waterboys
 Moving Hearts
 Peatbog Faeries
 Treacherous Orchestra
 Julie Fowlis
 Red Hot Chilli Pipers
 Four Men and a Dog
 Niteworks
 Larkin Poe

References

External links
 
 Stornoway Gazette Coverage

Tourist attractions in the Outer Hebrides
Music festivals in Scotland
Folk festivals in Scotland
Celtic music festivals
Music festivals established in 1996